The Pegaso class was a class of 18 Italian sea-going steam-powered torpedo boats built between 1904 and 1909. They served in the Italo-Turkish War and the First World War, when one was sunk, and continued in use until the 1920s.

Design
In 1904, four High-Seas Torpedo Boats were laid down at the Pattison shipyard of Naples, to a design licensed from the British shipbuilder Thornycroft. Two funnels were fitted. Torpedo armament consisted of three  torpedo tubes, with a gun armament of two 57 mm/43 guns and one 47 mm/43 gun.

While these four ships (known as the Perseo series) were built, launching and completing in 1905–06, work began on two further batches, with eight more being ordered from Pattison (the Cigno series) and six from Odero, Sestri (the Alcione series). Two of the Cignos, Calipso and Climene were fitted with oil fired boilers during construction, while six more ships (Pallade, Pegaso, Procione, Airone, Alcione and Ardea) were converted to oil fuel between 1908 and 1913.

The ships were re-armed during the First World War, with the Perseo and Cigno series replacing their armament with two 76 mm (3 in)/40 guns, one 13.2 mm machine gun and two 450 mm torpedo tubes. The Alcione  series' new armament differed in that one of the 76 mm guns was an anti-aircraft gun.

Service
In September 1911, the Italo-Turkish War broke out. The Italian Navy, including its torpedo boats, was highly active during the war. Actions involving the Pegaso class included Cigno carrying out shore bombardment along with larger units of the fleet in support of Italian land forces near Tripoli in November 1911, and a reconnaissance of the Dardanelles by five torpedo boats (the Sirio-class ship Spica and four Pegaso-class ships, Perseo, Astore, Climene and Centauro).

Several of the Pegaso class were used as high-speed minesweepers during the First World War. Perseo collided with sister ship Astore on 6 February 1917, and sunk when one of its torpedoes exploded. Arpia struck the wreck of the Neapolitan frigate Torquato Tasso (which had sunk off Porto d'Ascoli in 1861) on 17 January 1918. It sustained major damage and sank in shallow water, but was raised and repaired, re-entering service in July 1918.

The surviving vessels were discarded from 1923 to 1927.

Ships

Perseo series

Cigno series

Alcione series

Notes

Citations

References

External links
 Classe Pegaso Marina Militare website

Torpedo boats of the Regia Marina
World War I naval ships of Italy